The 2006 German Athletics Championships were held at the Donaustadion in Ulm on 15–16 July 2006.

Results

Men

Women

References 
 Results source: 

2006
German Athletics Championships
German Athletics Championships